Aleksandr Ivanovich Nekrasov (– 21 May 1957) was a mathematician known for his mathematical contributions to hydromechanics and aeromechanics.  The Nekrasov integral equation describing surface waves is named for him.

Biography 
Nekrasov was born in Moscow, Russian Empire where he would remain for the rest of his life. He went to school and graduated from the University of Moscow in 1906. Nekrasov graduated with a first class diploma. 

Nekrasov earned a gold medal for work of his essay, Theory of the Satellites of Jupiter.

References

External links 
Nekrasov biography hosted by the University of St Andrews

Mathematicians from the Russian Empire
Soviet mathematicians
1883 births
1957 deaths